Mirae Scientists Street Unha Tower or Galaxy Tower is a futuristic 53-story building in Pyongyang. It is the tallest of the towers on Mirae Scientists Street, and is considered to be the most eye-catching.

References

Further reading
 

2015 establishments in North Korea
buildings and structures completed in 2015
residential buildings completed in 2015
residential buildings in North Korea